Talom Rukbo  was the father of Donyi-Polo, a revivalist religious movement based in Arunachal Pradesh which attempts to reconstruct Tani (Adi) animist spirituality.

He has criticized Christian missionaries for fraudulent conversion practices in the Northeast of India.
 
Because of his contribution to the Adivasi way of life, Rukbo has been named one of the inspirations for the Vanavasi Kalyan Ashram project run by the Rashtriya Swayamsevak Sangh.

Publications
 Donyi-Polo faith and practice of the Adis -- Extr. de : Indigenous faith and practices of the tribes of Arunachal Pradesh, New Delhi : Himalayan Publ., 1998

References

Donyi-Polo
Indian religious leaders
People from Arunachal Pradesh
Anti-Christian sentiment in Asia